Cafe Du Nord is a 320-person capacity music venue in the basement level of the historic Swedish American Hall in San Francisco’s Upper Market neighborhood.

History

Both Cafe Du Nord and The Swedish American Hall have hosted internationally known musicians, up and coming bands, and local artists nearly every night of the week. The venues are known for hosting many now famous bands when they were first starting out. Notable shows include Arthur Lee and Love’s last show, Neil Young, The Zombies, Dave Davies (the Kinks), John Cale, J. Mascis, Frank Black, Blink 182, St. Vincent, The Decemberists, Spoon, Iron and Wine, Rilo Kiley, Vincent Gallo, Mumford and Sons, Train, Cake,  Sara Bareilles, Andrew W.K., Brian Jonestown Massacre, Girls, Tash Sultana, Alkaline Trio, and the comedian Scott Capurro.

Similar local and intimate live music venues in San Francisco include the Bottom of the Hill, Public Works SF, The Independent, the Brick and Mortar Music Hall, Hotel Utah, the Knockout SF, Tempest Bar, and the Chapel SF.

Awards
The venue's intimate setting and reputation for hosting outstanding live shows have earned Cafe Du Nord and the Swedish American Hall numerous awards over the years including: a 2013 "Nightey" Award for Best Live Music Venue in San Francisco (under 400 capacity) the California Music and Culture Association's "Best Music Venue" 2012, Top 40 Music Venues in America, Paste Magazine, and one of California's "Top Ten Most Beautiful Music Venues," CA Home and Design.

References

External links

Music venues in San Francisco
Market Street (San Francisco)
Nightclubs in San Francisco
Restaurants in San Francisco